María del Carmen Pérez Cuadra (born November 28, 1971, in Jinotepe, Carazo) is a Nicaraguan writer. She has won multiple awards for her poetry and short narrative writing, and published multiple books. , she was a doctoral candidate in Literature at the Pontifical Catholic University of Chile.

Life 
Pérez Cuadra's father was a bricklayer, and her mother was a nursing assistant. She was motivated to become a writer by an interview of Franz Galich that she read in the cultural supplement of a newspaper.

In the late 1990s, Pérez Cuadra moved to Costa Rica to work as a domestic worker to pay for her bachelor's degree, which she received from Central American University (Managua). She later received a master's degree in Latin American and Central American literature from the same university, with a thesis analyzing the writing of Central American short stories during and after the period of the Sandinista revolution.

In 2010, Pérez Cuadra and her family moved to Santiago, Chile for work reasons, intending to stay for two years. Their stay lasted longer, and she eventually applied to the Pontifical Catholic University of Chile as a doctoral candidate in Literature. , she was still a doctoral candidate there.

Pérez Cuadra's writing often deals with feminist and gay themes, although she does not consider herself a feminist writer. Her story "Une ciudad de estatuas y perros" explores migration and culture.

Books 

 Sin luz artificial: narraciones [Without artificial light: narrations], in Spanish, published 2004
 Une ciudad de estatuas y perros [A city of statues and dogs], in Spanish, published 2014
 Rama. Microficciones [Branch. Microfictions], in Spanish, published 2016
 Isonauta [Isonaut], in Spanish, published 2020

Awards 

 Rafaela Contreras Central American Short Narrative Prize, 2004
 El Cisne National Prize for Unedited Poetry, 2008
 María Teresa Sánchez National Prize for Short Narrative, 2014

References

External links 

 Pérez Cuadra's blog

Central American University alumni
1971 births
Nicaraguan women writers
Living people